Antanas Andrijauskas (born 3 November 1948) is a Lithuanian habilitated doctor, head of the Department of Comparative Culture Studies at the Culture, Philosophy, and Arts Research Institute, Professor at Vilnius University and the Vilnius Academy of Fine Arts, president of the Lithuanian Aesthetic Association, and a member of the Lithuanian Academy of Sciences.

Biography 

Antanas Andrijauskas was born in Kaunas, Lithuania. In 1972 he took first place in the International Young Scientists Competition and was awarded a gold medal. He graduated Lomonosov Moscow State University with a degree in philosophy in 1978, and in 1990 he defended his habilitated doctoral dissertation. During 1981–1982 he studied at the University of Paris-Sorbonne (Paris –IV) and the Collège de France, and in 1998 conducted research at the University of Paris-X Nanterre Centre de recherches sur l’art. He has lectured as a visiting professor at various French, Japanese, Canadian, Belgian, Swiss, Finnish, Polish, Russian, and other institutions of higher education.

Research 

Professor Andrijauskas is considered one of modern Lithuania's most outstanding representatives in the humanities, and has authored 26 monographs, 47 studies, 45 compiled books, and over 650 scientific articles in various languages. Over 100 books have been issued under his supervision by various publishers. His contribution to Lithuanian philosophy, comparative civilization studies, cultural studies, aesthetics, the philosophy of art, the history of ideas, and Oriental studies is important. He has founded and is the editor-in-chief of seven academic publication series and is a member of the editorial boards of seven Lithuanian and international journals. For the series of scholarly works Comparative Research into Culture, Philosophy, Aesthetics, and Art, he was awarded the National Prize for Lithuanian Scholarship in 2003.

Other professional activities 

 Editor series: Kultūrologija (Culturology)
 Editor series: Bibliotheca Orientalia et Comparativa
 Editor series: Rytai-Vakarai: Komparatyvistinės studijos (East – West: Comparative studies)
 Editor series: Neklasikinė filosofija (Non-classical Philosophy)
 Editor series: Estetikos ir meno filosofijos tyrinėjimai (Aesthetics and Philosophy of Art Studies)
 Editor series: Lietuvos kultūros tyrinėjimai (Studies of Lithuanian Culture)
 Editor series: Lietuvos žydų kultūros tyrinėjimai (Studies of Lithuanian Jewish Culture)
 Member, Editorial board of Lithuanian Encyclopedia
 Member, International Research Group and Editorial Board of Non-classical Aesthetics
 Member, Editorial Board of The Neighbourhoods of Cultures, the Borderlines of Arts
 Member, Editorial Board of Acta Orientalia Vilnensis
 Member, Editorial Board of Logos
 Member, Editorial Board of Eidos
 Member, Editorial Board of Limes
 Member, Editorial Board of Sovijus
 Coordinator of post-graduate program, Institute of Culture, Philosophy, and Art, Vilnius
 Member of 30 Doctoral Committees
 Chief of 6 Doctoral Committees

Bibliography

Books 
 Andrijauskas Antanas. Meno filosofija: Kritinė XVIII-XX a. koncepcijų analizė. (Philosophy of Art: A Critical Analysis of 18th-20th-Century Conceptions.) Vilnius: Mintis, 1990.
 Andrijauskas Antanas. Grožis ir menas. Estetika ir meno filosofijos idėjų istorija: Rytai-Vakarai. (Beauty and Art. History of Ideas of Aesthetics and Philosophy of Art: East-West.) Vilnius: VDA leidykla, 1995. – 702 p. First edition.
 Andrijauskas Antanas. Grožis ir menas. Estetika ir meno filosofijos idėjų istorija: Rytai-Vakarai. (Beauty and Art. History of Ideas of Aesthetics and Philosophy of Art: East-West.) Vilnius: VDA leidykla, 1996. -707 p. Second edition.
 Andrijauskas Antanas. Civilizacijos teorijos metamorfozės ir komparatyvizmo idėjų sklaida. (Changing Theories of Civilizition and the Spread of the Idea of Comparative Studies.) Vilnius: Gervelė, 1999 -156 p.
 Andrijauskas Antanas. Kultūros universumas: morfologinės analizės prolegomenai. (The Universe of Culture: Prolegomena to Morphological Analysis.) Vilnius: Gervelė, Vilnius, 2000 – 165 p.
 Andrijauskas Antanas. Andrijauskas A. Tradicinė japonų estetika ir menas. (Traditional Japanese Aesthetics and Art.) Vilnius: Vaga, 2001- 670 p.
 Andrijauskas Antanas. Orientalistika ir komparatyvistinės studijos. (Oriental and Comparative Studies.) Vilnius, 2001- 168 p.
 Andrijauskas Antanas. Lyginamoji civilizacijos idėjų istorija. (A Comparative History of the Idea of Civilization.) Vilnius: VDA, 2001 – 628 p.
 Andrijauskas Antanas. Istorinė Rytų ir Vakarų civilizacijų santykių raida. (The Historical Evolution of Relations between Eastern and Western Civilizations.) Vilnius: Gervelė, 2002 – 195 p.
 Andrijauskas Antanas. Kultūrologijos istorija ir teorija. (The History and Theory of Cultural Studies.), Vilnius: VDA leidykla, 2003- 635 p.
 Andrijauskas Antanas. Kultūros, filosofijos ir meno profiliai (Rytai-Vakarai-Lietuva) (Profiles of Culture, Philosophy, and Art (East-West-Lithuania.),Vilnius: Gervelė, 2004 – 623 p.
 Andrijauskas Antanas. and others. Lietuviškojo europietiškumo raida: dabarties ir ateities iššūkiai. (The Development of Lithuanian Europeanness: Challenges of Present and Future) Kolektyvinė monografija, KFMI l-kla. Sudarė A. Andrijauskas, Vilnius, 2006. – 288 p.
 Andrijauskas Antanas. Komparatyvistinė vizija:Rytų estetika ir meno filosofija. (Comparative Vision: Aesthetics and Art Philosophy of the East.) KFMI l-kla, Vilnius, 2006. – 138 p.
 Andrijauskas Antanas. Litvakų dailė L’école de Paris aplinkoje.(Litvak Art in the Context of L’école de Paris.) Vilnius: Vilniaus aukciono biblioteka, Meno rinka, 2008. – 312 p.
 Andrijauskas Antanas. Litvak Art in the Context of L’école de Paris. Vilnius: Vilniaus aukciono biblioteka, Meno rinka, 2008. – 312 p.
 Andrijauskas Antanas. Neklasikinės ir postmodernistinės filosofijos metamorfozės. (Metamorphoses of Non–classical and Postmodern Philosophy.). Vilnius: Vilniaus aukciono biblioteka, Meno rinka, 2010. – 648 p.
 Andrijauskas Antanas. Adomas Galdikas: Lyrinės abstrakcijos erdvių link. (Adomas Galdikas: A Winding Path to the Expanses of Lyrical Abstraction.). Vilnius: Vilniaus aukciono biblioteka, Meno rinka, 2014. – 336 p. .
 Andrijauskas Antanas. Amžinybės ilgesys: Tradicinė indų kultūra, estetika ir menas. (The Nostalgy of Eternity: Traditional Indian Culture, Aesthetics and Art.). Vilnius: LKTI l-kla, 2015.- 608 p. .
 Andrijauskas Antanas. Vaizduotės erdvės: Tradicinė kinų estetika ir menas. (Spaces of Imagination: Traditional Chinese Aesthetics and Art.). Vilnius: LKTI, 2015.- 608 p. .
 Andrijauskas Antanas. Artimųjų Rytų, Indijos ir Islamo pasaulių estetika ir meno teorija [Aesthetics and Art Theory of the Near East, India, and the Islamic Words]. Vilnius: LKTI, 2017.- 720 p. .
 Andrijauskas Antanas. Rytų Azijos tradicinė estetika ir meno teorija [Far East Traditional Aesthetics and Art Theory]. Vilnius: LKTI, 2017.- 720 p. .
 Andrijauskas Antanas. Vakarų estetika ir meno filosofija [Western Aesthetics and the Philosophy of Art]. Vilnius: LKTI, 2017.- 720 p. .
 Andrijauskas Antanas and Andrijauskas Konstantinas. Civilizacijos istorijos metamorfozės: Komparatyvistinis požiūris į neeuropinį pasaulį. (Metamorphoses in the History of Civilization: A Comparative Analysis of the Non-European World.). Vilnius: LKTI, 2018. – 608 p..
 Andrijauskas Antanas. Meno psichologija: nuo kūrybingumo ištakų iki psichopatologijos. (Psychology of Art: from the Origins of Creativity to Psichopatology). Vilnius: LKTI, 2019.- 840 p. ISSN 1822-3192; ISBN 978-609-8231-19-9.
 Andrijauskas Antanas. Teosofinės meno filosofijos idėjų atspindžiai Stabrausko ir Čiurlionio tapyboje (Reflections of Ideas of Theosophical Philosophy of Art in Painting by Stabrauskas and Čiurlionis). Vilnius: LKTI, 2021. – 288 p. ISBN 9786098231342.
 Andrijauskas Antanas. Čiurlionio orientalizmo metamorfozės (Metamorphoses of Čiurlionis Orientalism) Vilnius: LKTI, 2022.- 168 p. ISSN 2783-6274; ISBN 978-6098-231-39-7

Compilations 
 Estetikos istorija. Antologija, t. 1: Senovės Rytai / Antika. (History of Aesthetics. Anthology, vol. 1. Ancient East. Antiquity) Sudarė A. Andrijauskas, Pradai, Vilnius, 1999. - 708 p.
 Ortega y Gasset J. Mūsų laikų tema ir kitos esė. Sudarė A. Andrijauskas, Vaga, Vilnius, 1999. - 549 p.
 Jung C. G. Psichoanalizė ir filosofija. (Psychoanalysis and Philosophy) Sudarė A. Andrijauskas, Vilnius, Pradai, 1999. - 439 p.
 Rytai-Vakarai: Komparatyvistinės studijos – I, (East – West: Comparative studies – I ), Vaga. Sudarė A. Andrijauskas, Vilnius, 2002. - 495 p.
 Rytai-Vakarai. Komparatyvistinės studijos – II. Kultūrologija-7 ( East – West: Comparative studies – II. Culturology – 7. ), KFMI l-kla. Sudarė A. Andrijauskas, Vilnius, 2001. - 384 p.
 Rytai-Vakarai. Komparatyvistinės studijos – III. Kultūrologija-8 ( East – West: Comparative studies – III. Culturology – 8), KFMI l-kla. Sudarė A. Andrijauskas, Vilnius, 2002. – 591 p.
 Rytai-Vakarai: Kultūrų sąveika, ( East – West: Interactions of Cultures?? ),Lumen fondas. Sudarė A. Andrijauskas, Vilnius, 2002.- 357 p.
 Estetikos ir meno filosofijos transformacijos (Transformations of Aesthetics and Philosophy of Art), Vilnius, KFMI l-la. Sudarė A. Andrijauskas, Vilnius, 2005.- 700 p.
 Rytai-Vakarai. Komparatyvistinės studijos – IV ( East – West: Comparative studies – IV ),. Kultūrologija-12, KFMI l-kla. Sudarė A. Andrijauskas, Vilnius, 2005. – 591 p.
 Egzistencijos paradoksai: Kierkegaardo filosofinės interpretacijos (The Paradoxes of Existence: Interpretations of Kierkegaard's Philosophy), Versus Aureus, Sudarė A. Andrijauskas, Vilnius, 2006. – 336 p.
 Lietuviškojo europietiškumo raida: dabarties ir ateities iššūkiai (The Development of Lithuanian Europeaness: Challenges of Present and Future), Kolektyvinė monografija, KFMI l-kla. Sudarė A. Andrijauskas, Vilnius, 2006. – 288 p.
 Estetikos ir meno filosofijos teritorijų kaita (Alternation of Aesthetics and Philosophy of Art), KFMI l-la. Sudarė A. Andrijauskas, Vilnius, 2006.- 600 p.
 Vytenis Lingys: tapyba, piešiniai, (Vytenis Lingys: Paintings and Drawings) Sudarė A. Andrijauskas,Vilnius, 2006.- 156 p.
 Gyvenimo apologija: Nietzsche‘ės interpretacijos (Apologia of Life: Interpretations of Nietzsche's Philosophy), Versus Aureus, Sudarė A. Andrijauskas, Vilnius, 2006. – 496 p.
 Komparatyvistinė Rytų ir Vakarų estetika (Comparative Eastern and Western Aesthetics), KFMI l-la. Sudarė A. Andrijauskas, Vilnius, 2006.- 543 p.
 Rytai-Vakarai. Komparatyvistinės studijos – V. Kultūrologija -14 ( East – West: Comparative studies – V. Culturology -14). Vilnius, KFMI l-kla. Sudarė A. Andrijauskas, Vilnius, 2006. – 511 p.
 Solomonas Teitelbaumas: tapyba, piešiniai, Vilnius, Maldis, Sudarė A. Andrijauskas, 2007. – 111 p.
 Rytai-Vakarai. Komparatyvistinės studijos – VI, ( East – West: Comparative studies – VI ), Vilnius, KFMI l-kla. Sudarė A. Andrijauskas, Vilnius, 2007. – 496 p.
 Valios metafizika: Schopenhaurio filosofijos interpretacijos (Metaphysics of Will: Interpretations of Schopenhauer's Philosophy), Versus Aureus, Sudarė A. Andrijauskas, Vilnius, 2007. – 528 p.
 Estetikos ir meno filosofijos probleminių laukų sąveika (Interactions of Problem Fields of Aesthetics and Philosophy of Art), KFMI l-la. Sudarė A. Andrijauskas, Vilnius, 2008.- 544 p.
 Rytai-Vakarai. Komparatyvistinės studijos – VII ( East – West: Comparative studies – VII ), Vilnius, KFMI l-kla. Sudarė A. Andrijauskas, Vilnius, 2008. – 512 p.
 Gyvybinis polėkis: Bergsono filosofijos interpretacijos (Élan Vitale: Interpretations of Bergson's Philosophy), Versus Aureus, Sudarė A. Andrijauskas, Vilnius, 2008. – 537 p.
 Nacionalino tapatumo tęstinumas ir savikūra eurointegracijos sąlygomis, Sudarė A. Andrijauskas, V. Rubavičius, Kronta, Vilnius, 2008. – 288 p.
 Rytai-Vakarai. Komparatyvistinės studijos – VIII ( East – West: Comparative studies – VIII ), Vilnius, KFMI l-kla. Sudarė A. Andrijauskas, Vilnius, 2008. – 432 p.
 Žydų kultūra: istorija ir dabartis (Jewish Culture: History and the Present), Vilnius, Kronta, Sudarė A. Andrijauskas, Vilnius, 2009. – 461 p.
 Postmodernizmo fenomeno interpretacijos (Interpretations of Postmodernism Phenomenon) Vilnius, Versus aureus, Sudarė A. Andrijauskas, Vilnius, 2009. – 602 p.
 Gamtos grožis V. A. Kaliūno kūriniuose (The Beauty of Nature in Kaliūnas‘ Art Works), Bitutes, Sudarė A. Andrijauskas, Vilnius, 2010. – 108 p.
 Rytai–Vakarai. Komparatyvistinės studijos – IX ( East – West: Comparative studies – IX ), Vilnius, LKTI l–kla. Sudarė A. Andrijauskas, Vilnius, 2010.– 512 p.
 Rytai–Vakarai. Komparatyvistinės studijos – X. Sigitas Geda: pasaulinės kultūros lietuvinimas (East – West: Comparative studies – X. Sigitas Geda: Lithuanianization of World Culture), Vilnius, LKTI l–kla. Sudarė A. Andrijauskas, Vilnius, 2010.– 600 p.
 Rytai–Vakarai. Komparatyvistinės studijos – XI. Kultūrų sąveikos ( East – West: Comparative studies – XI. Interaction of Cultures), Vilnius, LKTI l–kla. Sudarė A. Andrijauskas, Vilnius, 2011.– 592 p.
 Rytai–Vakarai. Komparatyvistinės studijos – XII Algio Uždavinio fenomenas ( East – West: Comparative studies – XII. A Phenomenon of Algis Uždavinys), Vilnius, LKTI l–kla. Sudarė A. Andrijauskas, Vilnius, 2012.– 576 p.
 Lietuvos žydų kultūros paveldas: Kasdienybės pasaulis (Lithuanian Jewish Cultural Heritage: Everyday World), Vilnius, LKTI L-la, Sudarė A. Andrijauskas, 2013.- 576 p.
 Kultūrologija 19. Rytai-Vakarai. Komparatyvistinės studijos – XIII. (East – West: Comparative studies – XIII. Culturology 19 ). Sudarė A. Andrijauskas. Vilnius: LKTI l-kla, 2014.- 704 p.
 Psichoanalizės fenomeno interpretacijos (Interpretations of the Phenomenon of Psychoanalysis), Vilnius, Vilniaus aukciono biblioteka, Sudarė A. Andrijauskas, V. Rubavičius, Vilnius, 2016. – 592 p.
 Kultūrologija 20. Rytai-Vakarai. Komparatyvistinės studijos – XIV.( East – West: Comparative studies – XIII. Culturology 20). Sudarė A. Andrijauskas. Vilnius: LKTI l-kla, 2016.- 608 p.
 Soutine and L’école de Paris. From Shmuel Tatz's Art Collection, Edited by Antanas Andrijauskas. New York – Vilnius, 2016.
 Valentinas Algirdas Kaliūnas. Varėnos kraštas: Kūrybos versmės. (Valentinas Algirdas Kaliūnas. The Land of Varėna). Sudarė A. Andrijauskas. Vilnius: Bitutės, 2019 – 168 p. ISBN 978-9986-439-54-7, ISBN 978-998-6439-54-7
 Iššūkis metafizikai: Lietuviškos Heideggerio filosofjos interpretacijos. (The Challenge to Metaphysics: Lithuanian Interpretations of Heidegger's Philosophy). Sudarė A. Andrijauskas. Vilnius: LKTI l-kla, 2019. – 608 p. ISSN 1822-6523, ISBN 978-609-8231-17-5.
 Albertas Gurskas. Kaligrafijos meno versmės: Tekstai Lietuvai. (Albertas Gurskas. Sources of Calligraphy Art. Texts for Lithuania). Sudarė A. Andrijauskas, Daliūtė Ivanauskaitė. Vilnius, Lietuvos Nacionalinis muziejus, 2020 – 176 p. ISBN 978-609-4780-37-0
 Meda Norbutaitė. Tapyba. (Meda Norbutaitė. Painting). Sudarė A. Andrijauskas. Vilnius: Dailininkų sąjungos leidykla, 2020 – 288 p. ISBN 978-609-8154-17-7.
 Comparative Culture Studies in Philosophy and Aesthetics. Guest-editor. – Antanas Andrijauskas // Dialogue and Universalism, Journal of the International Society for Universal Dialogue, Vol. XXX. No. 3/2020. – 300 p. ISSN 1234-5792.
 Jonas Daniliauskas, Tarp baltų ėriukų. Tapyba. Piešiniai. sudaryt. Antanas Andrijauskas, Vilnius: LDS, 2021, – 207 p. ISBN 978-609-8154-21-4.
 Estetikos ir meno filosofijos tyrinėjimai. VII. Estetikos ir meno filosofijos teorinės problemos (Aesthetics and Philosophy of Art Studies. VII. Theoretical Problems of Aesthetics and Philosophy of Art) sudaryt. Antanas Andrijauskas, Vilnius: LKTI, 2021, – 416 p. ISSN 1822-3192.
 Saulius Kruopis. Meditacijos: Spalvų ir simbolių pasaulis. Meno albumas (Meditations: a World of Colors and Symbols. Art Album / sudarė Antanas Andrijauskas, Vilnius: Petro Ofsetas, 2022. – 240 p. ISBN 978-609-8271-02-7.

References 
 Culture, Philosophy, and Arts Research Institute Website: Paskolos verslui

1948 births
20th-century essayists
20th-century Lithuanian educators
20th-century Lithuanian historians
20th-century Lithuanian philosophers
21st-century essayists
21st-century Lithuanian educators
21st-century Lithuanian historians
21st-century Lithuanian philosophers
Continental philosophers
Critical theorists
Cultural historians
Intellectual history
Literacy and society theorists
Literary theorists
Lithuanian art historians
Lithuanian essayists
Lithuanian literary critics
Lithuanian male writers
Lithuanian social scientists
Living people
Mass media theorists
Moscow State University
People from Kaunas
Philosophers of art
Philosophers of culture
Philosophers of education
Philosophers of history
Philosophers of social science
Philosophy writers
Social commentators
Social philosophers
Theorists on Western civilization
Academic staff of the Vilnius Academy of Arts
Academic staff of Vilnius University
Writers about activism and social change
Writers about globalization
Writers from Kaunas